Hezar Jerib (also Romanized as Ḩezār Jerīb, Hezār Jarīb, Hazār Jarīb, and Hazār Jerīb) is a village in Haram Rud-e Sofla Rural District, Samen District, Malayer County, Hamadan Province, Iran. At the 2006 census, its population was 178, in 46 families.

References 

Populated places in Malayer County